Skrjabinema ovis is a nematode species of the genus Skrjabinema within the Oxyuridae family. This species typically parasitise ruminants. Skrjabinema ovis is known to invade the intestinal tract of the Guanaco, Lama guanacoe, after ingestion of eggs of this worm.

References 
 Chemical Institute of Canada. 1934. Canadian Journal of Research, National Research Council of Canada, v.10 Jan-Jun
 C. Michael Hogan. 2008. Guanaco: Lama guanicoe, GlobalTwitcher.com, ed. N. Strömberg

Line notes 

Rhabditia
Oxyurida
Nematodes described in 1915
Parasitic nematodes of mammals